Nicholas Ward (born 30 November 1977 in Wrexham, Wales), is a retired footballer who played as a forward for Shrewsbury Town in The Football League. He played in the Welsh Premier League for a number of team - where he spent most of his career. After retiring as a player he moved into management and is currently manager of Penycae.

He made his debut for the Shrews on 15 October 1996 in the Second Division 2–1 defeat to Gillingham at Gay Meadow. He came on as a second-half substitute for Richard Scott.

In June 2011 he rejoined The New Saints signing a new contract with the club in May 2012.

On deadline day – 31 August 2012, he left TNS re-signing with his former club Newtown, for a third time.

In October 2013 he joined former club Cefn Druids.

He retired from football in the summer of 2014 to further his coaching career and joined Penycae as assistant manager. He was appointed manager of the club later that season.

On 3 June 2016 it has been announced that Nicky will be joining Brickfield Rangers as a Player Coach.

Honours
 Welsh Premier League: Winners medal 2011/12 with The New Saints
 Welsh Premier League: Winners medal 2010/11 with Bangor City
 Welsh Cup Winners medal 2011/12 with The New Saints

References

External links

1977 births
Living people
Footballers from Wrexham
Welsh footballers
Association football forwards
Shrewsbury Town F.C. players
Telford United F.C. players
Bangor City F.C. players
English Football League players
Newtown A.F.C. players
The New Saints F.C. players
Cefn Druids A.F.C. players
Cymru Premier players
Welling United F.C. players
Conwy Borough F.C. players
Airbus UK Broughton F.C. players
Welsh football managers